Daniel Robertson Ramsay (1864 – before 1945) was an English professional footballer who played in the English Football League for Stoke, Northwich Victoria and Burslem Port Vale. He played in Stoke's first ever Football league team.

Career

Stoke
Ramsay joined Burslem Port Vale in April 1886, and played regular football until moving to Stoke in August 1888. He made his first-team debut on 8 September 1888, at wing-half for Stoke in a 2–0 defeat by West Bromwich Albion at the Victoria Ground. After going 21 games without scoring in 1888–89, as the "Potters" finished bottom of the English Football League in the first ever season of the competition, he scored the club's first league hat-trick in a 7–1 win over Accrington at the Victoria Ground. He scored a total of five goals in 26 appearances in 1889–90, having hit the net against Burnley and Old Westminsters.

Later career
He then played for Newton Heath and West Manchester, before joining Northwich Victoria in 1892. He scored three goals in 27 appearances across the 1892–93 season, and then two goals in eight games as Northwich were relegated out of the Second Division at the end of the 1893–94 season. He rejoined Burslem Port Vale in October 1893. He was a first team player, but was limited to 16 Second Division appearances in 1893–94 because his knee kept going out of joint, and he was released in May 1894.

Career statistics
Source:

References

1864 births
People from West Derby
Year of death missing
English footballers
Association football fullbacks
Port Vale F.C. players
Stoke City F.C. players
Manchester United F.C. players
Northwich Victoria F.C. players
English Football League players